In his Systema Naturae of 1758, Carl Linnaeus divided the Order Primates within Mammalia into four genera: Homo, Simia, Lemur, and Vespertilio. His Vespertilio included all bats, and has since been moved from Primates to Chiroptera. Homo contained humans, Lemur contained four lemurs and a colugo, and Simia contained the other Primates. Linnaeus did not think that Homo should form a distinct group from Simia, classifying them separately mainly to avoid conflict with religious authorities. If this is taken into account, Simia (including Homo) would be roughly equivalent to the Suborder Haplorhini of the Primates (while Lemur would be roughly equivalent to the Suborder Strepsirrhini).

Homo, Lemur, and Vespertilio have survived as generic names, but Simia has not. All the species have since been moved to other genera, and in 1929, the International Commission on Zoological Nomenclature ruled in its Opinion 114 that Simia be suppressed. The genus Simias is distinct and remains valid, containing a single species, the pig-tailed langur (Simias concolor).

The original genus Simia came to include these species:

See also
Mammalia in the 10th edition of Systema Naturae

References

External links
 Disposition of Primate Names Used by Linnaeus

Obsolete primate taxa
Primate genera
Taxa named by Carl Linnaeus